Scott Paluch is a regional manager for USA Hockey and a former ice hockey player and coach.

Career
After being selected by St. Louis in the 5th round of the 1984 NHL Entry Draft, Paluch debuted for Bowling Green a year after the Falcons won the National Championship. In four years under Jerry York Paluch was the team's top scoring defenseman three times, helping the Falcons win a regular season title and tournament title while also serving as team captain in his senior season. After graduating Paluch played two seasons with Peoria before retiring.

Paluch returned to Bowling Green as a volunteer assistant coach in 1990-91, remaining there until 1994 when he followed his former coach, Jerry York, to Boston College. Paluch remained in Boston for eight years before returning to his alma mater as head coach, replacing Buddy Powers in 2002–03. Paluch was tasked with repairing the fading program and while the Falcons produced some respectable years, Paluch was unable to get Bowling Green a winning season. Shortly after the 2008 economic crash, it was revealed that eliminating the University's varsity program was being considered as a way to save money. In the midst of the program's uncertainty Paluch accepted an offer to join USA Hockey, leaving assistant coach Dennis Williams to serve as interim coach for the 2009–10 season.

Paluch has continued with USA Hockey since 2009 and is currently the Regional Manager, American Development Model.

Career statistics

Head coaching record

Awards and honors

References

External links

1966 births
Living people
Boston College Eagles men's ice hockey coaches
Peoria Rivermen (AHL) players
Bowling Green Falcons men's ice hockey players
Bowling Green Falcons ice hockey coaches
Sportspeople from Chicago
St. Louis Blues draft picks
Ice hockey coaches from Illinois
Ice hockey people from Chicago
American people of Slavic descent
American men's ice hockey defensemen
AHCA Division I men's ice hockey All-Americans